The Little Nyonya is a 2008 drama serial on Singapore's free-to-air MediaCorp TV Channel 8. It stars Jeanette Aw, Qi Yuwu, Dai Xiangyu, Lin Meijiao, Pan Lingling, Cynthia Koh, Pierre Png, Joanne Peh, Desmond Sim, Eelyn Kok, Andie Chen, Ng Hui and Xiang Yun as the casts of the series. The storyline, which circles around the biographical flashback of an extended Peranakan family in Malacca, is set in the 1930s and spans to over 70 years and several generations of three families.

It debuted on 25 November 2008 and concluded its run on 5 January 2009. It was shown on weekdays at 9pm. The series was partly sponsored by the Media Development Authority of Singapore.

Produced by MediaCorp in commemoration of the channel's 45th anniversary, The Little Nyonya is widely regarded as one of the greatest television series on Channel 8. It has been acclaimed by viewers and critics, and ranked the highest viewership in the country in 14 years. The success of The Little Nyonya has led to the show being broadcast internationally. The series became the first ever Singaporean Chinese drama to be dubbed in Malay and aired on Malay-language channel Suria. In December 2016, the subscription-based streaming service Netflix acquired broadcasting rights for the series. The series spawned a Chinese remake of the same name broadcasting on CCTV, which aired for 45 episodes beginning 28 June 2020 and ended on 20 July. Singapore aired the remake from 5 January 2021 until 10 March 2021.

Plot
The story spans over 70 years, from the 1930s till present day.

During a flashback to the past, Huang Ju Xiang is born into a large Peranakan family in Malacca where her mother is a mistress. Not only is Ju Xiang kind and beautiful, she is also remarkable at all skills a Nyonya is expected to have. However, Ju Xiang is a deaf-mute due to a serious illness when she was young. Although she is the daughter of the respectable Huang family, Ju Xiang and her mother Tian Lan are treated as servants due to their illegitimate status, having no say in anything.

During a feast hosted by the Huang family, Ju Xiang catches the eyes of many men - Chen Sheng, the second son of the respectable Chen family, Charlie Zhang, a powerful and cunning businessman, and 
Yamamoto Yousuke, a Japanese photographer. Seeing his family's matriarch is also fond of Ju Xiang, Chen Sheng proposes to ask for Ju Xiang's hand in marriage but is ultimately turned down because of her disability. Ju Xiang is then forced to be Charlie's mistress by the Huang family in return for business gains. She resists the marriage by running away from home but gets kidnapped by human traffickers. Yosuke rescues her but gets knocked out by Charlie's lackeys after. Ju Xiang finds herself in Charlie's hotel room about to be raped but Yosuke saves her once again. Both of them flee back to Yosuke's studio in Singapore and elope to escape Charlie's clutches.

After 2 years of blissful life, Ju Xiang is pregnant. Yosuke goes back to Japan to visit his ill father but does not return as promised. Ju Xiang painstakingly raises her daughter Yue Niang for 8 years with the support of Chen Sheng.

Just as World War II breaks out in Singapore, Yosuke returns. It is revealed that shortly after returning to Japan, he was forced into military by the Japanese for the past few years, and has only managed to return by deserting his post. However, the family reunion is shortlived as Ju Xiang and Yamamoto die during the war, leaving behind their daughter. 

The orphaned Yue Niang eventually arrives at the Huang family's house on her own. Her grandmother Tian Lan and faithful servant Ah Tao rejoice at her return. Yue Niang learns to cook Peranakan dishes and sew, being as remarkable as Ju Xiang was.

Yue Niang grows up looking exactly like her beautiful mother. After the war, the Huang family members who sought refuge in England return home. Yue Niang ends up leading an abusive life just like her mother, but she puts up with the mistreatment to protect her grandmother.

Yue Niang catches the eye of Chen Xi, who is the nephew of Chen Sheng. Chen Xi pretends to be a chauffeur so that Yue Niang will befriend him. Yueniang's kindness, purity and persistence move Chen Xi and he falls in love with her. This incurs the wrath of the Huang family as they intend to marry off either of Yue Niang's cousins - Zhen Zhu, the mean elder sister and Yu Zhu, the kind younger sister.

Despite Chen Xi's determination, he is arranged to marry Yu Zhu after many sabotages and obstacles. At the same time, Yue Niang is forced to marry a lowly butcher turned gangster boss, Liu Yi Dao. Chen Sheng reminds Chen Xi to not give up on Yue Niang like he did with Ju Xiang, so Chen Xi works with Yu Zhu, who supports Chen Xi's and Yue Niang's relationship, to help them elope. 

On the night when Yu Zhu helps Yue Niang escape, Yu Zhu is raped by Robert Zhang, son of Charlie, who had mistaken Yu Zhu for Yue Niang. Zhen Zhu takes Yu Zhu's place in marrying Chen Xi, who had no say in the marriage as he was gravely ill and in a coma after the unsuccessful elopement. In shock and guilt for Yu Zhu's plight, Yue Niang marries Yi Dao without resistance. Yu Zhu is then married off to Robert, who mistreats her and turns her insane.

After marrying Yi Dao, Yue Niang decides she will not accept the life made by others for her and tries to end her life. Her strong personality impresses Yi Dao and they become sworn siblings instead. 

Yue Niang begins learning to trade and becomes a successful businesswoman. She makes peace with the Huang family by inviting them back to live in the ancestral house which she has bought from the bank. Chen Xi, still in love with Yue Niang, tries to ask for her hand in marriage again, but she turns him down to avoid a divorce scandal for the respectable Chen family.

Yueniang ends up marry a charming and righteous British lawyer, Paul. Zhen Zhu leaves her loveless marriage and Chen Xi starts a relationship with good friend Libby. Yue Niang adopts Yu Zhu's son and names him Zu Ye. Zu Ye has two sons and a daughter.

Back in the present time, the elderly Yue Niang's granddaughter, Angela, realises Yu Zhu is her biological grandmother and grieves for Yu Zhu's bitter life. Yue Niang finishes telling Angela their family history and tells Angela to never forget their family roots. Shortly after, Yue Niang passes away peacefully wearing a traditional white garment, signifying that she will be reunited with her husband in the afterlife.

Cast

Main 

 Yan Bingliang as Huang Yuan (黄元)
 Lin Meijiao as Lin Guihua (林桂花)
 Xiang Yun as Wang Tianlan (王天兰)
 Guan Xuemei 管雪梅 as Tua Kor (大姑)
 Jeanette Aw as Huang Juxiang (黄菊香)
 Darren Lim as Huang Jincheng (黄金成)
 Apple Hong as Huang Meiyu (黄美玉) 
 Pan Lingling as Xiufeng (秀凤)
 Cynthia Koh as Xiujuan (秀娟)

Second generation

 Jeanette Aw as Yamamoto Yueniang (山本月娘)
 Younger version portrayed by Christabelle Tan 
 Andie Chen as Huang Tianbao (黄天宝)
 Eelyn Kok as Huang Zhenzhu (黄珍珠)
 Joanne Peh as Huang Yuzhu (黄玉珠)

Third generation

 Edsel Lim as Zuye (祖业)

Fourth generation

 Felicia Chin as Angel (安琦)

Chen family

 Li Yinzhu as Madame Chen (陈老太) 
 Chen Xiang as Chen Gong (陈功) 
 Yang Yanqing as Xiulian (秀莲) 
 Pierre Png as Chen Sheng (陈盛) 
 Qi Yuwu as Chen Xi (陈锡)

Zhang family

 Desmond Sim as Charlie Zhang (查里张)
 Henry Heng as Zhang Tianfu (张添福)
 Zen Chong as Robert Zhang (罗伯张)

Other characters

 Ng Hui as Ah Tao (阿桃)
 Dai Xiangyu as Yamamoto Yousuke
 Yao Wenlong as Liu Yidao (劉一刀)
 Pamelyn Chee as Libby (丽贝儿) 
 Nat Ho as Jonathan Li Xiuwen (李修文)
 Li Yuejie as Da Sha (大傻)
 Bobby Tonelli as Paul 
 Jeszlene Zhou as Jinhua (金花)
 Peer Metze as Smith 
 Chua Cheng Pou as Hei Gou (黑狗)

Development and production

The Little Nyonya took a year of research and four months to film. More than 150 staff members were involved in production of the series and the cast was required to travel frequently from Singapore to Penang, Malacca and Ipoh during filming. The Little Nyonya was notable for having the highest production budget in the history of MediaCorp due to the elaborate period costumes. A pair of beaded shoes traversed over a cost of SGD$1200, while a dining table acquired for the set cost $15000.

Rumours indicate that the role of Xiufeng was initially offered to May Phua, who turned the offer down due to her pregnancy at the time of filming, which resulted Pan Lingling taking over the role. Huang Biren was said to be a prime candidate for the role of Tian Lan, although the actress' decision not to renew her contract with MediaCorp ultimately resulted in Xiang Yun obtaining the part. It was also rumoured that Zoe Tay had expressed interest in portraying a role in the series, although there were no suitable roles for her. Elvin Ng was originally considered to be portraying Yamamoto Yousuke, but unfortunately, he was injured before filming began, which resulted Dai Xiangyu replacing him. Andrew Seow was first choice to play Robert Zhang but he declined due to him leaving MediaCorp and not renewing his contract, which resulted the role being replaced and portrayed by Zen Chong.

The series initially received a 30-episode order, although over-runs in filming led the series to be extended to 34 episodes instead. Possibly as a result, two episodes were aired on Mondays from 15 December 2008 till the conclusion of the series.

Promotion
Promotion for The Little Nyonya lasted throughout the initial broadcast of the series as well after the series ended. Twelve members of the cast participated in "The Little Nyonya Public Event" 小娘惹户外影迷会 at Compass Point on 27 December 2008, which included an autograph session. An estimated 5000 people were present during the event. 100 posters were given out to members of the audience. The unprecedented number of appearances resulted in damage of the flooring at Compass Point. Certain tiles on the floor cracked under the pressure exerted by the crowd.

Due to the overwhelming response of the initial public event, a "Thank You Roadshow" was held at Suntec City on 31 January, where fans were allowed to take photographs with the cast and then shake hands. It featured several cast members from the first event as well as Olivia Ong, who recorded the theme song of the series.

Minor roadshows were held at various locations between January and April 2009. On 17 January, Jeanette Aw and Xiang Yun promoted bird nest at Tiong Bahru Plaza, while Qi Yuwu and Joanne Peh appeared at Courts Megastore along Tampines Road. Qi and Peh later appeared in character as part of the official launch for Media Fiesta at Marina Square on 5 March. On 26 April, Aw and Pierre Png made an appearance at the first anniversary of the Singapore Peranakan Museum shortly before leaving to attend the Star Awards.

Chinese New Year Special
In response the tremendous support to the show, the producers filmed a one-hour special, showcasing the stars enjoying a special Nyonya's reunion dinner, "The Little Nyonya's Big Reunion", which was aired on day one of the Lunar New Year (26 January 2009) at 7pm. It was hosted by Dasmond Koh and featured Yan Bingliang, Lin Meijiao, Pan Lingling, Darren Lim, Li Yinzhu, Cynthia Koh, Eelyn Kok, Andie Chen, Joanne Peh, Zen Chong, Dai Xiangyu, Jeanette Aw, Xiang Yun, Pierre Png, Qi Yuwu, Ng Hui and Yao Wenlong. The cast talked about the filming experiences and about the unexplained fates of characters that were not mentioned in the finale. Unaired blooper clips and behind-the-scenes shots were also shown. The special also had a special re-run on 8 February 2009 (day 14 of the New Year) at 9pm.

Home media release
The series was released by MediaCorp a 2-volume DVD boxset. The first volume, which contained the first 12 episodes of The Little Nyonya was released to stores on 6 January 2009. The remaining episodes were compiled in the second volume and released two weeks later. The boxset contains no special features, although it is accompanied by a booklet which provides descriptions of the major characters in the show, as well as a family tree.

Commercial performance
The Little Nyonya achieved extremely high ratings during its initial run, with an average of 993 000 viewers per episode and peaking at 1.67 million viewers on the final episode. In addition, the series achieved the highest viewership rating in Singapore in 14 years.

Viewership for The Little Nyonya steadily increased throughout its run. Its first episode garnered an estimated 1.098 million viewers, which equates to 20.3% of the country's population. On Episode 11, the show rating increased to 23.6%. The 15th and 16th episodes, both broadcast back-to-back, was watched by 24.1% of the country's population. The rating increased by 2.2% a week later, and further increased to 27.8% by the 27th and 28th episodes. The viewership peaked at 33.8% on the final two episodes, also broadcast back-to-back.

Critical response
The Little Nyonya has been critically acclaimed. However, despite being lauded as a drama that provides an insight into the unique Peranakan culture, the show has received criticism in local media over portrayals and promotion. Issues that were raised early included the castings of Pan Lingling and Cynthia Koh to portray teenage girls albeit being already in their thirties. This issue was counter-argued by being tantamount to ageism, as well as the fact that it was raised only three episodes after the show began airing. The character development of Xiufeng has come under fire due to the character's exhibitions of violence.

Criticism was also leveled at MediaCorp's bias towards Jeanette Aw. Many viewers saw The Little Nyonya as a television series conceived as a launching vehicle for Aw's career in television and to secure an award at the next Star Awards. Several viewers also believe that the producers intentionally wrote Aw's first role as a mute in attempt to conceal her imperfect delivery of Mandarin. In response, producers have lauded Aw's work, saying that she performed in a professional manner. Despite this, Aw's portrayal of Juxiang and Yueniang has been praised by members of the audience.

Mass publicity for The Little Nyonya began two months before the show premiered – it had also received criticism from the public. Within MediaCorp, there are also some misgivings in regards to the over-promotion this show has received. The cast of the long-running drama Love Blossoms have privately lamented that the show, which used to receive tremendous amounts of advertising support from MediaCorp, is being neglected in favour of The Little Nyonya.

As many of the Peranakan characters in the series (such as most of the Huang family, as well as Charlie Zhang and son Robert) are antagonists (Jincheng, Xiufeng and Huangyuan are part-time antagonists), many viewers think that the series will negatively stereotype Peranakans as being ruthless. In response, the show's writer, Ang Eng Tee, said that ruthlessness and petty politicking, which are basic human interactions, appears within any culture, and is not an exclusive trait of the Peranakans.

Due to the usage of dramatic license, the series also contains a significant number of historical inaccuracies, particularly in the first few episodes involving Juxiang's life and Yueniang's childhood. Notable examples include the outbreak of the Second Sino-Japanese War in 1932 (as opposed to 1937) and the first air raid on Singapore (8 December 1941) occurring in broad daylight (which took place at night in reality).

The Little Nyonya: The Final Chapter
The scriptwriter of the series, Ang Eng Tee (also known as Hong Rongdi 洪荣狄), plotted five endings for the series, four of which would involve Yueniang and Chen Xi reuniting and living happily ever after.

The ending used in the series was criticised by fans to be too sad and abrupt. The response also prompted Ang to say that had he know that viewers would react as such, he would have Yueniang and Chen Xi reunite, for TV dramas are, in his words, made for viewers. In response to the criticisms, MediaCorp decided to make an alternate ending, which was aired on 11 January 2009 at 9:55pm. The ending, titled "The Little Nyonya: The Final Chapter" (小娘惹之月娘与陈锡重逢篇, literally: "The Little Nyonya: The Chapter of Yueniang and Chen Xi Reuniting), lasted for three minutes. According to producers, the script for the alternate ending was finalised on 8 January, and filming was completed on the following day.

Although it was rumoured that the ending would reunite Yueniang and Chen Xi, and have them living happily ever after, the new ending merely had Yueniang and Chen Xi tell each other why they could not be together. Yueniang and Chen Xi ended up separated, just as it was in the original ending. This drew heavy criticism from viewers, who told local newspapers that they felt they were being cheated. In response, MediaCorp said that this was not an "alternate ending", as some have suggested. Rather, it is a special presentation to show the station's appreciation to the fans of the series.

Accolades
This drama was seen as an extremely strong contender in the Star Awards 2009, held on 26 April 2009, minting a new record of having 16 nominations in the acting category, surpassing former record holder's Holland V (which got nine) until it was topped by the first season of The Dream Makers in 2014, which have 21. The series became the biggest winner for the ceremony, taking home nine awards including the Drama Serial and the Top Viewership Drama Serial of 2008 (tying with the first season of The Dream Makers later in 2014); it was at the time the series won the most awards in a Star Awards ceremony until in the 2016 ceremony, the record was superseded by the second season of The Dream Makers, which received 26 nominations, and won 12.

The spin-off series, The Little Nyonya Reunion Special, and the promotional ad for the encore telecast for the series, were respectively nominated for Star Awards 2010 and Star Awards 2011, with the latter clinching the award.

In total, the entire Little Nyonya franchise won a combined 11 awards from four award ceremonies.

Legacy 
The Little Nyonya has had notable cultural impact in Singaporean media. It was notably parodied in the variety show, Black Rose. In the episode when the encore started its debut, Chen Hanwei played Liu Yidao (留一刀) and Dennis Chew portrayed Yamamoto Yue Niang (山本月娘). It was also used in the skit segment of Star Search 2010 Grand Finals in which contestants played Liu Yidao, Yuzhu, Ah Tao and Robert Zhang.

In an interview with Lianhe Wanbao, the series' scriptwriter, Ang Eng Tee, said that if the demand exists, he will write a special presentation, or even a sequel to the series. Ideas for a possible sequel or special presentation have already been drafted by Ang, one of which would have Angela receiving a secret wooden box from Ah Tao, before Angela returns to Singapore. The box was owned by Yueniang, and Ah Tao defied her orders to burn the contents before Yueniang died. The box contained details on Yueniang and Chen Xi's relationship, in addition to a letter from Libby, telling Yueniang that Chen Xi and Libby did not get married after all. However, it was noted that production sequels have been much frowned upon by producers, and owing to the high production costs, a sequel seems to be very unlikely, but another drama in 2010 Unriddle is having a sequel to the original in 2012.

The Peranakan Ball
On 16 May 2009, Jeanette Aw and Dai Xiangyu starred in a musical called The Peranakan Ball (Chinese: 娘惹之恋). The musical is based on the story of Cinderella and it stars Jeanette Aw as Bee Tin, a Nyonya servant in a wealthy Peranakan household, and unrelated to the television series, even though the concept was clearly derived from the drama.

Pretty Maid
While not promoted as such, and the program was produced by a different television station, many Singaporeans who watched the series  believe it copies the main plot of The Little Nyonya. Pretty Maid was produced by Yu Zheng and broadcast by Hunan Broadcasting System in China. On 6 May, Pretty Maid'''s writer Li Yaling (李亚玲) claimed that Yu Zheng indeed plagiarized from The Little Nyonya. She claimed that Yu Zheng once told her that as long as plagiarism does not exceed 20% then the courts would have no case. Another writer Zou Yue (邹越) also claimed to have heard the "20% rule" from Yu Zheng. 于正，他们忍你很久了 

The Little Nyonya 2020 remake
In October 2018, it was announced that a Chinese remake of the show was in the works and would be aired on Chinese online video platform, iQiyi initially slated for 2019, but now in 2020. It is a joint production between iQiyi, Changxin Pictures and Singapore-based G.H.Y Culture & Media and will star Xiao Yan, Kou Chia-Jui, Yue Lina, He Yuhong, Darren Chiu, Dai Xiangyu, Xiang Yun, Jeffrey Xu and Fang Cheng Cheng as the main leads. Additionally, Dai, who played Yamamoto Yousuke in the original series, is reprising as the same role in the remake series. A mixture of Malaysian, Singaporean, and Chinese actors from China, Hong Kong, Taiwan and even Canada were cast as the other major and minor characters in the remake.

The remake's plot was generally reminiscent of the original's, though there are a few changes made to the plot, with some filling the plot holes of the original. The significant changes are that in the ending, both Yueniang and Chen Xi are reunited six years after Yueniang's presumed death, and happily married; Yu Zhu's mental condition improved and she reunited with the Huang family after her recovery; the adopted son of Robert Zhang and Yu Zhu was named Huang Cien (黄慈恩) instead of Zuye (祖业), following his mother's surname while subsequently allowing his own descendants to adopt the surname Chen (Chen Xi's surname); and that both Libby and Paul are engaged to different people. Another hidden ending (albeit speculated) is that both Chen Xi and Yueniang have one daughter together, and the daughter was subsequently married to Cien and have children with one another.

Other changes were made to the fates of some characters: Huang Tianbao; instead of being sentenced to death, was shot and killed by police after attempting to kill Chen Gong and Chen Xi, whom he took hostage for ransom, Huang Zhenzhu; who lost all her money to her Caucasian lover whom she eloped with, and feeling too ashamed to see her family, she became a prostitute who entertain British customers and subsequently died in a car accident, Charlie Zhang; who died protecting his son from being shot by Tianbao, and Robert Zhang; who was not killed by Tianbao but fell to his death while trying to escape from Tianbao. Unlike the original series, the whole remake series was narrated by Yueniang's granddaughter instead of Yueniang herself to her granddaughter, as her granddaughter did not appear in the remake.

Singapore would eventually air the remake which premiered on 5 January 2021 at 11pm. The series finale aired on 10 March 2021.

Other series references
 The series title was mentioned by Somaline Ang in episode 81 of 118.
 The scene where Yuzhu (Joanne Peh) is eating the bugs in the hut after being driven insane is mentioned by Dennis Chew in episode 122 of 118.
The store opened by the Hong family in The Journey: Our Homeland is named Little Nyonya/小娘惹. Both English and Chinese names of the store are references to the series' title. Although it maybe coincidental, the first series of The Journey, The Journey: A Voyage, has an antagonist named Charlie Zhang, which has the same name and the same background (educated in Britain) as the main antagonist of The Little Nyonya''.

International release history
The drama serial was broadcast overseas, mostly in the Asian region.

In Indonesia, aired on B Channel starts July 2011.
The series was originally scheduled to air in Malaysia in mid-January, but was later delayed to February. The series was also aired by TV stations in Cambodia, Vietnam, and Mainland China.

On 1 December 2009, Tai Seng Entertainment Channel, an ethnic Chinese entertainment channel on DirecTV, became the first non-Asian station to air The Little Nyonya. It is also the first station to air the series with Cantonese dubbing.

Hong Kong broadcaster TVB purchased the rights to telecast the series in April 2009, and aired the series a year later, in late April 2010. Like the US, the series has also been Cantonese-dubbed.

The series was promoted at the MIPTV Television Trade Show in Cannes, France, near the end of March 2009. Qi Yuwu and Jeannette Aw were also in Cannes to promote the series at MIPTV.

See also
 List of MediaCorp Channel 8 Chinese Drama Series (2000s)
 List of The Little Nyonya episodes

References

External links
 
 The Little Nyonya on IMDb

Singapore Chinese dramas
2008 Singaporean television series debuts
2009 Singaporean television series endings
Channel 8 (Singapore) original programming